The list below consists of the reasons delivered from the bench by the Supreme Court of Canada during 1985. This list, however, does not include decisions on motions.

Reasons

Notes

References
 1985 decisions: CanLII 

Reasons Of The Supreme Court Of Canada, 1985
Supreme Court of Canada reasons by year